St. Augustine Day School, Shyamagar is located in Shyamnagar, North 24 Parganas, West Bengal, India. It was established in 1975 by C.R. Gasper and Edna Gasper. An English-medium school, it has about 3000 students from Nursery to Class XII.The school is run, managed and governed by the St. Augustine Education Society, Calcutta, a registered society under the West Bengal Societies Registration Act 1961. It is steered by its President, Janet Gasper Chowdhury and Secretary & CEO, Amitava Chowdhury. The Principal is Rev. Rodney Borneo. 

The campus comprises 3 buildings & a playground. The old building was built in 1976. In 2018 the new building was inaugurated. Since then most of the classes are located in the new building.  

During the COVID-19 pandemic, the school held classes via an online platform. During this time the school also held numerous contests and ceremonies in online platforms.

Other schools under the same management are St. Augustine's Day School, Barrackpore (ICSE / ISC); St. Augustine's Day School for Girls, Barrackpore (CBSE), and St. Augustine's Day School for Boys, Barrackpore (CBSE)

Motto
"Learning Leadership Loyalty"

Address
179, B.C.Roy Road, Shyamnagar, North 24 Parganas, West Bengal, India.

See also
Education in India
List of schools in India
Education in West Bengal
St. Augustine's Day School, Barrackpore

References

External links

Primary schools in West Bengal
High schools and secondary schools in West Bengal
Schools in North 24 Parganas district
Educational institutions established in 1975
1975 establishments in West Bengal